Shin (also spelled Šin or Sheen) is the twenty-first letter of the Semitic abjads, including Phoenician Shin , Hebrew Shin , Aramaic Shin , Syriac Shin ܫ, and Arabic Šin  (in abjadi order, 13th in modern order).

The Phoenician letter gave rise to the Greek Sigma (which in turn gave Latin  and Cyrillic С), and the letter Sha  in the  Glagolitic and Cyrillic scripts.

The South Arabian and Ethiopian letter Śawt is also cognate.

Origins

The Proto-Sinaitic glyph, according to William Albright, was based on a "tooth" and with the phonemic value š "corresponds etymologically (in part, at least) to original Semitic ṯ (th), which was pronounced s in South Canaanite".

The Phoenician  letter expressed the continuants of two Proto-Semitic phonemes, and may have been based on a pictogram of a tooth (in modern Hebrew shen). The Encyclopaedia Judaica, 1972, records that it originally represented a composite bow.

The history of the letters expressing sibilants in the various Semitic alphabets is somewhat complicated, due to different mergers between Proto-Semitic phonemes. As usually reconstructed, there are seven Proto-Semitic coronal voiceless fricative phonemes that evolved into the various voiceless sibilants of its daughter languages, as follows:

Aramaic Shin/Sin

In Aramaic, where the use of shin is well-determined, the orthography of sin was never fully resolved.

To express an etymological /ś/, a number of dialects chose either sin or samek exclusively, where other dialects switch freely between them (often 'leaning' more often towards one or the other). For example:

Regardless of how it is written, /ś/ in spoken Aramaic seems to have universally resolved to /s/.

Hebrew Shin / Sin

Hebrew spelling: 

The Hebrew  version according to the reconstruction shown above is descended from Proto-Semitic  *, a phoneme thought to correspond to a voiceless alveolar lateral fricative  , similar to Welsh Ll in "Llandudno".

See also Hebrew phonology, Śawt.

Sin and Shin dot
Prior to the advent and ascendancy of Tiberian orthography, the two were distinguished by a superscript samekh, i.e. ש vs. שס, which later developed into the dot. In the biblical name Issachar only, the second sin/shin letter is always written without any dot, even in fully vocalized texts. This is because the second sin/shin is always silent.

Unicode encoding

Significance
In gematria, Shin represents the number 300. The breakdown of its namesake, Shin[300] - Yodh[10] - Nunh[50] gives the geometrical meaningful number 360, which encompasses the fullness of the degrees of circles.

Shin as a prefix commonly used in the Hebrew language carries similar meaning as specificity faring relative pronouns in English– "that (..)", "which (..)" and "who (..)". When used in this way, it is pronounced like 'sh' and 'eh'.
In colloquial Hebrew, Kaph and Shin together have the meaning of "when".

Shin is also one of the seven letters which receive special crowns (called tagin) when written in a Sefer Torah. See Gimmel, Ayin, Teth, Nun, Zayin, and Tzadi.

According to Judges 12:6, the tribe of Ephraim could not differentiate between Shin and Samekh; when the Gileadites were at war with the Ephraimites, they would ask suspected Ephraimites to say the word shibolet; an Ephraimite would say sibolet and thus be exposed. From this episode we get the English word shibboleth.

In Judaism
Shin also stands for the word Shaddai, a name for God. Because of this, a kohen (priest) forms the letter Shin with his hands as he recites the Priestly Blessing. In the mid-1960s, actor Leonard Nimoy used a single-handed version of this gesture to create the Vulcan hand salute for his character, Mr. Spock, on Star Trek.

The letter Shin is often inscribed on the case containing a mezuzah, a scroll of parchment with Biblical text written on it. The text contained in the mezuzah is the Shema Yisrael prayer, which calls the Israelites to love their God with all their heart, soul, and strength. The mezuzah is situated upon all the doorframes in a home or establishment. Sometimes the whole word Shaddai will be written.

The Shema Yisrael prayer also commands the Israelites to write God's commandments on their hearts (Deut. 6:6); the shape of the letter Shin mimics the structure of the human heart: the lower, larger left ventricle (which supplies the full body) and the smaller right ventricle (which supplies the lungs) are positioned like the lines of the letter Shin.

A religious significance has been applied to the fact that there are three valleys that comprise the city of Jerusalem's geography: the Valley of Ben Hinnom, Tyropoeon Valley, and Kidron Valley, and that these valleys converge to also form the shape of the letter shin, and that the Temple in Jerusalem is located where the dagesh (horizontal line) is. This is seen as a fulfillment of passages such as  that instructs Jews to celebrate the Pasach at "the place the LORD will choose as a dwelling for his Name" (NIV).

In the Sefer Yetzirah the letter Shin is King over Fire, Formed Heaven in the Universe, Hot in the Year, and the Head in the Soul.

The 13th-century Kabbalistic text Sefer HaTemunah, holds that a single letter of unknown pronunciation, held by some to be the four-pronged shin on one side of the teffilin box, is missing from the current alphabet. The world's flaws, the book teaches, are related to the absence of this letter, the eventual revelation of which will repair the universe.

In Russian 

The corresponding letter for the  sound in Russian is nearly identical in shape to the Hebrew shin. Given that the Cyrillic script includes borrowed letters from a variety of different alphabets such as Greek and Latin, it is often suggested that the letter sha is directly borrowed from the Hebrew letter shin (other hypothesized sources include Coptic and Samaritan).

Sayings with Shin
The Shin-Bet was an old acronym for the Israeli Department of Internal General Security, and name of the service is still usually translated as such in English. In Israeli Hebrew and Palestinian Arabic, the security service is known as the "Shabak".

A Shin-Shin Clash is Israeli military parlance for a battle between two tank divisions ("armour" in Hebrew is שִׁרְיוֹן - shiryon).

Sh'at haShin (the Shin hour) is the last possible moment for any action, usually military. Corresponds to the English expression the eleventh hour.

Arabic šīn/sīn
In the Arabic alphabet,  is at the original (21st) position in Abjadi order.

 represents , and is the 13th letter of the modern alphabet order and is written thus:

A letter variant   takes the place of Samekh at 15th position.

The Arabic letter šīn was an acronym for "something" ( šayʾ(un) ) meaning the unknown in algebraic equations. In the transcription into Spanish, the Greek letter chi (χ) was used which was later transcribed into Latin x. According to some sources, this is the origin of x used for the unknown in the equations.  However, according to other sources, there is no historical evidence for this.  In Modern Arabic mathematical notation,  sīn, i.e. šīn without its dots, often corresponds to Latin x.

In Moroccan Arabic, the letter , šīn with an additional three dots below, is used to transliterate the  sound in Spanish loan words.

Character encodings

References

External links

Phoenician alphabet
Arabic letters
Hebrew letterss